Pugh House may refer to:

 Jesse Pickens Pugh Farmstead, Grove Hill, AL, listed on the NRHP in Alabama
 Pugh House (Portland, Arkansas), listed on the NRHP in Arkansas
 Pugh House (Southville, Kentucky), listed on the NRHP in Kentucky
 Francis Pugh House, Clinton, NC, listed on the NRHP in North Carolina
 Pugh-Boykin House, Clinton, NC, listed on the NRHP in North Carolina
 Pugh House (Morrisville, North Carolina), listed on the NRHP in North Carolina
 Pugh-Kittle House, Baltimore, OH, listed on the NRHP in Ohio
 Rider-Pugh House, Kanab, UT, listed on the NRHP in Utah
 Edward Pugh House, Salt Lake City, UT, listed on the NRHP in Utah
 Captain David Pugh House, Hooks Mills, WV, listed on the NRHP in West Virginia